Dmytro Oleksandrovych Yukhymovych (born 27 July 1996) is a professional Ukrainian footballer who plays as a centre-back for Znicz Pruszków, on loan from Ahrobiznes Volochysk.

References

External links
 
 Team squad on Ahrobiznes Volochysk official website

1996 births
Living people
People from Starokostiantyniv
Ukrainian footballers
Association football defenders
Ukrainian First League players
Ukrainian Second League players
II liga players
FC Podillya Khmelnytskyi players
FC Ahrobiznes Volochysk players
Znicz Pruszków players
Ukrainian expatriate footballers
Expatriate footballers in Poland
Ukrainian expatriate sportspeople in Poland
Sportspeople from Khmelnytskyi Oblast